Minervarya pierrei (Pierre's wart frog, Pierre's cricket frog) is a species of frog in the family Dicroglossidae. It is found in Nepal, adjacent India, and eastern Bangladesh. It has recently been reported also from Bhutan.
It is a common species associated with paddy fields.

References

pierrei
Amphibians of Bangladesh
Amphibians of Bhutan
Frogs of India
Amphibians of Nepal
Amphibians described in 1975
Taxonomy articles created by Polbot
Taxobox binomials not recognized by IUCN